George Amponsah (born 1968 in Roehampton) is a British director of documentary films. His 2015 feature-length documentary about the death of Mark Duggan, The Hard Stop, won him a 2017 BAFTA nomination for the Award for Outstanding Debut by a British Writer, Director or Producer.

Biography 
Born and raised in London, Amponsah is of Ghanaian parentage. He started taking photographs and working with Super 8mm film in the 1980s. In 1989, he attended the University of East London, and a post-graduate film won him a scholarship to take the directing course at the National Film and Television School (NFTS). Since graduating in 2000 from the NFTS, he has taught documentary filmmaking there and at the Met Film School. He continued to work as a tutor with young people, while making short films for the web and developing new feature films. 

His 2004 BBC documentary The Importance of Being Elegant was about Congolese singer Papa Wemba. The Fighting Spirit (2007) followed three young boxers in Ghana.

His 2015 feature-length documentary about the death of Mark Duggan, The Hard Stop, was nominated in 2017 for a BAFTA in the category "Outstanding Debut by a British Writer, Director or Producer", and for two British Independent Film Awards: Best Documentary and Breakthrough Producer.

Amponsah's debut feature film, Gassed Up, was announced for launch on Amazon Prime Video in 2023.

Documentaries
 First steps, 1998.
 The Importance of Being Elegant, 2004.
 The Fighting Spirit, 2007.
 Bruised to Be Used, 2008.
 One Plus One, 2008.
 Diaspora Calling, 2011.
 The Hard Stop, 2015.
 Dope, 2018.
 Black Power: A British Story of Resistance, 2021.

References

External links
 
 Official website

1968 births
Living people
Black British cinema
Black British filmmakers
British film directors
British people of Ghanaian descent